St. Paul's Lutheran Elementary School is a private Lutheran elementary school in East Northport, New York. It is a member of the Long Island Lutheran Middle and High School Congregation Association.

References

External links
 Official website
 Archived website

Schools in Suffolk County, New York
Private elementary schools in New York (state)
Lutheran schools in New York (state)
1970 establishments in New York (state)
Educational institutions established in 1970